The following is a list of notable deaths in November 2007.

Entries for each day are listed alphabetically by surname. A typical entry lists information in the following sequence:
 Name, age, country of citizenship at birth, subsequent country of citizenship (if applicable), reason for notability, cause of death (if known), and reference.

November 2007

1
Sonny Bupp, 79, American child actor (Our Gang, Citizen Kane), last surviving credited cast member of Citizen Kane.
Troy Lee James, 83, American politician, member of the Ohio House of Representatives (1967–2000).
Edith Motridge, 94, American Olympic backstroke swimmer.
S. Ali Raza, 85, Indian Bollywood screenwriter, heart failure.
Paul Tibbets, 92, American pilot of the Enola Gay which dropped the atomic bomb on Hiroshima, heart failure.
Paul Woods, 57, British rugby union and rugby league player.

2
Oreste Benzi, 82, Italian Roman Catholic priest.
Henry Cele, 58, South African actor (Shaka Zulu) and soccer player.
Charmaine Dragun, 29, Australian television news presenter, apparent suicide by jumping.
The Fabulous Moolah, 84, American professional wrestler.
*Lord Michael Fitzalan-Howard, 91, British soldier and courtier, Marshal of the Diplomatic Corps (1972–1981).
Don Freeland, 82, American racecar driver (Indianapolis 500).
Witold "Vitek" Kiełtyka, 23, Polish drummer (Decapitated), injuries from bus crash.
Igor Moiseyev, 101, Russian choreographer, heart failure.
Jean Pierre Reguerraz, 68, Argentine actor.
Reay Tannahill, 77, British food historian and novelist.
S.P. Thamilselvan, 40, Sri Lankan leader of Tamil Tigers, air strike.
John Petersen, 65, Drummer for The Beau Brummels and Harpers Bizarre, Heart Attack.

3
Peter Andren, 61, Australian independent MP, pancreatic cancer.
*Maurice Noël Léon Couve de Murville, 78, French-born British Roman Catholic Archbishop of Birmingham (1982–1999).
Aleksandr Dedyushko, 45, Russian actor, car crash. 
Marilyn Martinez, 52, American stand-up comedian, colon cancer.
Donald Matthews, 82, American political scientist and author.
Martin Meehan, 62, Northern Irish republican, later Sinn Féin activist, heart attack.
Mary Walker Phillips, 83, American textile artist, Alzheimer's disease.
George Ratterman, 80, American professional football player (Cleveland Browns), complications from Alzheimer's disease.
Ryan Shay, 28, American long-distance runner, heart attack during Olympic marathon trials.

4
 Edward Bartels, 82, American basketball player.
 Cyprian Ekwensi, 86, Nigerian author.
 Swami Gahanananda, 91, Bangladeshi religious leader, 14th President of the Ramakrishna Order.
 Hideo Hagiwara, 94, Japanese painter.
 Dorothy LaBostrie, 79, American songwriter ("Tutti Frutti").
Karl Rebane, 81, Estonian scientist.
 Lennart Rönnback, 102, Finnish veteran of the Finnish Civil War, last of the White Guard. 
 Peter Viertel, 86, German-born American author and screenwriter.

5
 Andrea Aureli, 84, Italian actor.
 Roberto Bortoluzzi, 86, Italian sports journalist and radio broadcaster. 
 James Brabazon, 84, British author, lung cancer.
 Thelma Buchholdt, 73, Filipino-born American author and politician, pancreatic cancer.
 Nils Liedholm, 85, Swedish football midfielder and coach.
 Paul Norris, 93, American comic book artist, co-creator of Aquaman.
 Paul Soloway, 66, American five-time world bridge champion, complications of infection.

6
 Enzo Biagi, 87, Italian journalist.
 Hilda Braid, 78, British actress (EastEnders, Citizen Smith).
 John Grenier, 77, American politician, former executive director of the Republican National Committee.
 George Grljusich, 68, Australian sports broadcaster, lung cancer.
 Sayed Mustafa Kazemi, c. 48, Afghan politician, former commerce minister, victim of Baghlan factory bombing.
 Fred W. McDarrah, 81, American photographer (Village Voice), documented the rise of the Beat Generation.
 George Osmond, 90, American patriarch of the Osmond singing family.
 Jimmy Staggs, 72, American radio disk jockey, esophageal cancer.
 Hank Thompson, 82, American country music singer, lung cancer.
 Hajji Muhammad Arif Zarif, Afghan politician and businessman, victim of Baghlan factory bombing.

7
 Pekka-Eric Auvinen, 18, Finnish mass murderer, suicide by gunshot.
 Hobart Brown, 74, American sculptor, founder of the Kinetic Sculpture Race, pneumonia.
 Earl Dodge, 74, American presidential candidate (Prohibition Party), heart attack.
 Paul Dojack, 93, Canadian Football League referee.
 George W. George, 87, American Broadway and film producer (My Dinner With Andre), Parkinson's disease.
 Salome Gluecksohn-Waelsch, 100, German-American geneticist.
 Petr Haničinec, 77, Czech actor.
 Arthur Hezlet, 93, British Royal Navy Vice-Admiral, submariner and naval historian.
 Lidia Ivanova, 71, Russian TV journalist, announcer and writer, diabetes. 
 Alejandra Meyer, 70, Mexican telenovela actress, heart failure. (Spanish)

8
 John Arpin, 70, Canadian pianist and composer, cancer.
 Stephen Fumio Hamao, 77, Japanese Roman Catholic cardinal, former bishop of Yokohama, lung cancer.
 Bobby Harrop, 71, English footballer (Manchester United).
 Donald R. Herriott, 79, American physicist.
 Francine Parker, 81, American film director (FTA), heart failure.
 Dulce Saguisag, 64, Filipino politician, former Secretary of Department of Social Welfare and Development, car accident.
Motosuke Takahashi, 66, Japanese film director and storyboard artist, lung cancer.
 David G. P. Taylor, 74, British businessman and public official, Governor of Montserrat (1990–1993).
 Bungo Tsuda, 89, Japanese politician, former governor of Kanagawa Prefecture, colorectal cancer. 
 Chad Varah, 95, British Anglican priest, founder of the Samaritans.

9
 Helen H. Bacon, 88, American classical scholar.
 Luis Herrera Campins, 82, Venezuelan President (1979–1984), after long illness.
Lorraine Fisher, 79, American baseball player (AAGPBL).
 Bill Hosokawa, 92, Japanese American author and journalist.
 Ilya Zbarsky, 94, Russian head of Lenin's Mausoleum.

10
 Laraine Day, 87, American actress (Foreign Correspondent, The High and the Mighty).
 John Fee, 43, Northern Irish nationalist politician (SDLP), brain tumour.
 Augustus F. Hawkins, 100, American member of the U.S. House of Representatives from California (1963–1991).
 Norman Mailer, 84, American Pulitzer Prize–winning author (The Naked and the Dead, The Executioner's Song), renal failure.
 John H. Noble, 84, American prisoner in Russian gulag and author (I Was a Slave in Russia), heart attack.
 Sir John Stanier, 82, British Army field marshal, Chief of the General Staff (1982–1985).
 Donda West, 58, American Professor and Mother of Kanye West, coronary artery disease.

11
 Anders Hald, 94, Danish statistician. 
 Yukio Hayashida, 91, Japanese politician (House of Councillors), governor of Kyoto, Minister of Justice, heart failure. 
 Kojiro Kusanagi, 78, Japanese actor, interstitial lung disease.
 Berkeley Lent, 86, American judge on the Oregon Supreme Court, heart attack.
 Delbert Mann, 87, American film director (Marty, Separate Tables, The Bachelor Party), Oscar winner (1956), pneumonia.
 Dick Nolan, 75, American NFL player and coach (San Francisco 49ers, New Orleans Saints), father of 49ers coach Mike Nolan.
 Omwony Ojwok, 60, Ugandan politician, former minister, heart failure.
 Margarito Pomposo, 96–97, Mexican Olympic long-distance runner.
 Tadahiro Sekimoto, 80, Japanese electronics engineer and business executive, former president and chairman of NEC, stroke.
Trish Williamson, 52, British TV-am weather presenter and producer, car crash.

12
 Ferdinando Baldi, 80, Italian screenwriter, film director and producer.
 Louis Galen, 82, American philanthropist and banker, heart failure.
Ying Hope, 84, Chinese Canadian politician.
 Khanmohammed Ibrahim, 88, Indian test cricketer.
 Vijay Kumar Khandelwal, 71, Indian parliamentarian.
 Piet Koornhof, 82, South African politician, former minister and ambassador.
Ira Levin, 78, American author (Rosemary's Baby, The Stepford Wives) and playwright (Deathtrap), heart attack.
Tinius Nagell-Erichsen, 73, Norwegian publisher (Aftenposten and Verdens Gang).
 Janlavyn Narantsatsralt, 50, Mongolian Prime Minister (1998–1999), car crash.
A. Palanisamy, 74, Indian volleyball player.
Peter "Cool Man" Steiner, 90, Swiss musician and entertainer, fall. (German)
 Lester Ziffren, 101, American reporter during Spanish Civil War, screenwriter and diplomat, heart failure.

13
 Wahab Akbar, 47, Filipino politician, representative for Basilan province, victim of 2007 Batasang Pambansa bombing.
 Harold J. Berman, 89, American Harvard Law School professor (1948–1985).
 Alec Cooke, Baron Cooke of Islandreagh, 87, British peer and former Northern Ireland Senator.
 John Doherty, 72, British football player for Manchester United (1952–1957) and Busby Babe.
 Hugh Gibbons, 91, Irish parliamentarian and Gaelic football player.
 Tony Harris, 36, American basketball player (Washington State Cougars), possible suicide.
 Kazuhisa Inao, 70, Japanese Hall of Fame baseball player for the Nishitetsu Lions (1956–1969), cancer.
 Erik Kurmangaliev, 47, Russian-Kazakh opera singer, liver disease.
 Sir John Loveridge, 82, British MP (1970–1983).
 Robert Taylor, 59, American 4 × 100 m relay gold medallist at the 1972 Summer Olympics, cardiac arrhythmia.
 Monty Westmore, 84, American makeup artist (Hook, Jurassic Park, Star Trek: First Contact).
 Peter Zinner, 88, American film editor (The Deer Hunter, The Godfather, An Officer and a Gentlemen), Oscar winner (1979).

14
 Michael Blodgett, 68, American actor and screenwriter (Beyond the Valley of the Dolls), heart attack.
 Ronnie Burns, 72, American actor, adopted son of George Burns and Gracie Allen, cancer.
 Hila Elmalich, 33, Israeli fashion model, anorexia nervosa.
 Bertha Fry, 113, American supercentenarian, third-oldest person in the world, pneumonia.
David Oppenheim, 85, American clarinetist, television producer and academic administrator (Tisch School of the Arts).
 Yadav Pant, 82, Nepalese economist and politician.
 Pablo Antonio Vega Mantilla, 88, Nicaraguan Roman Catholic Bishop of Juigalpa.

15
John Cross Jr, 82, American pastor of the 16th Street Baptist Church, stroke.
* Sergio del Valle Jiménez, 80, Cuban general and politician, former Army Chief of Staff and minister.
Domokos Kosáry, 94, Hungarian historian, president of the Hungarian Academy of Sciences (1990–1996).
Audrey McCall, 92, American activist, First Lady of Oregon (1967–1975), widow of former Governor Tom McCall, complications from a fall.
Lauren S. McCready, 92, American admiral, pioneer of the United States Merchant Marine Academy, heart failure.
 Joe Nuxhall, 79, American Major League Baseball pitcher and broadcaster for the Cincinnati Reds, cancer.
 George Van Meter, 75, American Olympic cyclist.

16
Harold Alfond, 93, American businessman and philanthropist.
Gene H. Golub, 75, American mathematician and computer scientist, myeloid leukemia.
Pierre Granier-Deferre, 80, French film director.
Grethe Kausland, 60, Norwegian actress and singer, lung cancer.
Patrick F. Kelly, 78, American federal judge.
Trond Kirkvaag, 61, Norwegian comedian, cancer. 
Don Metz, 91, Canadian ice hockey player (Toronto Maple Leafs).
James Daniel Niedergeses, 90, American Roman Catholic Bishop of Nashville (1975–1992), hemorrhage.
Victor Rabinowitz, 96, American lawyer for left-wing clients and causes.
Andrea Stretton, 55, Australian arts journalist and television presenter, lung cancer.
Sir Arthur Watts, 76, British lawyer and diplomat.

17
Irving Bluestone, 90, American negotiator for UAW, heart failure.
Landis Everson, 81, American poet, apparent suicide by gunshot.
Oleg Gazenko, 88, Russian space scientist.
Hy Lit, 73, American radio disc jockey, Parkinson's disease.
Robert Evander McNair, 83, American politician, Governor of South Carolina (1965–1971), brain cancer.
Ambroise Noumazalaye, 74, Congolese politician, Prime Minister (1966–1968). (French)
R. S. Pathak, 82, Indian jurist, former Chief Justice of India, heart attack.
Vernon Scannell, 85, British poet, long illness.
Gail Sheridan, 92, American actress, stroke.

18
Hollis Alpert, 91, American film critic, co-founded National Society of Film Critics, pneumonia.
Peter Cadogan, 86, British writer and political activist (anti-nuclear campaigner).
Jim Ford, 66, American singer songwriter.
John Hughey, 73, American steel guitar player for Vince Gill and Conway Twitty, heart failure.
Ellen Preis, 95, Austrian fencer, gold medallist at the 1932 Summer Olympics, kidney failure. (German)
Joe Shaw, 79, British footballer, appearance record holder for Sheffield United.
Chickie Williams, 88, American country music singer and wife of Doc Williams.

19
André Bettencourt, 88, French Resistance fighter and politician.
Paul Brodie, 73, Canadian saxophonist.
Nyimpine Chissano, 37, Mozambican businessman, son of ex-president Joaquim Chissano, heart attack.
 Kevin DuBrow, 52, American rock singer (Quiet Riot), accidental cocaine overdose.
Wiera Gran, 91, Polish singer and actress.
Mike Gregory, 43, British Lions rugby league captain, motor neurone disease.
Peter Haining, 67, British author, heart attack.
Ken Leek, 72, British international footballer (Wales, Birmingham City).
Laulu Fetauimalemau Mata'afa, 79, Samoan educator, community worker, diplomat and former Member of Parliament.
Channaiah Odeyar, 91, Indian Lok Sabha MP.
Graham Paddon, 57, British footballer (Norwich City, West Ham United).
Milo Radulovich, 81, American airman threatened by McCarthyism and championed by Edward R. Murrow, stroke.
Jim Ringo, 75, American professional football player (Green Bay Packers) and member of the Pro Football Hall of Fame.
John Straffen, 77, British murderer, Britain's longest serving prisoner (56 years), natural causes.
Magda Szabó, 90, Hungarian writer.
Dick Wilson, 91, British-born American actor ("Mr. Whipple"), natural causes.

20
 Nigel Bridge, Baron Bridge of Harwich, 90, British judge.
 James Lamond, 78, British Lord Provost of Aberdeen, MP (Oldham East, Oldham Central and Royton) (1970–1992), pneumonia.
 Ernest "Doc" Paulin, 100, American jazz musician.
 Ian Smith, 88, Rhodesian politician, Prime Minister (1964–1979).

21
Valda Aveling, 87, Australian pianist, harpsichordist and clavichordist.
Fernando Fernán Gómez, 86, Spanish actor.
Andrew Foldi, 81, Hungarian opera singer.
Tom Johnson, 79, Canadian Hall of Fame hockey player, heart failure.
Richard Leigh, 64, American author (The Holy Blood and the Holy Grail).
Noel McGregor, 75, New Zealand Test cricketer.
Herbert Saffir, 90, American engineer, co-creator of the Saffir-Simpson Hurricane Scale; complications from surgery.

22
Maurice Béjart, 80, French choreographer.
Jefferson J. DeBlanc, 86, American fighter pilot, Medal of Honor recipient, pneumonia.
Takami Eto, 82, Japanese politician, former member of the House of Representatives, heart failure.
Vladimir Kazantsev, 84, Russian Olympic athlete, silver medalist in 3000m steeplechase (1952).
Verity Lambert, 71, British TV producer, BBC's first female producer (Doctor Who).
Richard Nolte, 86, American expert on the Middle East, complications from a stroke.
Reg Park, 79, British bodybuilder, Mr. Universe (1951), skin cancer.
Dallas Schmidt, 85, Canadian fighter pilot and politician.

23
Peter Burgstaller, 43, Austrian football goalkeeper (Austria Salzburg), shot.
Patricia M. Byrne, 82, American diplomat, United States Ambassador to Burma (1979–1983), cerebral hemorrhage.
Aloysius C. Galvin, 82, American Jesuit priest, President of the University of Scranton (1965–1970), cancer.
Maximiliano Garafulic, 69, Chilean Olympic basketball player.
Frank Guarrera, 83, American baritone with the Metropolitan Opera.
Joe Kennedy, 28, American baseball player, hypertensive and valvular heart disease.
Vladimir Kryuchkov, 83, Russian former KGB chief, led coup against Mikhail Gorbachev.
Colin Park, 63, Canadian Olympic sailor
Óscar Carmelo Sánchez, 36, Bolivian footballer, cancer.
William Tallon, 72, British servant to HM Queen Elizabeth, the Queen Mother.
Francesc Candel Tortajada, 82, Spanish Catalan writer, cancer. 
Henrietta Valor, 72, American Broadway singer and actress, Alzheimer's disease.
Robert Vesco, 73, American fugitive financier, lung cancer.
Edmund Hoyle Vestey, 75, British businessman.
Pat Walsh, 71, New Zealand rugby union player and selector, All Black (1955–1964).

24
Farid Babayev, Russian politician with the Yabloko party, homicide by gunshot.
Casey Calvert, 26, American guitarist (Hawthorne Heights), accidental combined drug intoxication.
Imil Jarjoui, 72, Palestinian member of the Palestinian Legislative Council and the PLO executive committee, heart attack.
Antonio Lamer, 74, Canadian lawyer and Chief Justice of Canada (1990–2000), heart disease.
 Joseph Minish, 91, American member of the US House of Representatives from New Jersey (1963–1985).
 William O'Neill, 77, American politician, Governor of Connecticut (1980–1991), complications of emphysema.
Emily Sander, 18, American murder victim.
 David Sheldon, 54, American professional wrestler ("Angel of Death").
 David H. Shepard, 84, American inventor, bronchiectasis.

25
Lola Almudevar, 29, British news reporter, car accident.
Agnethe Davidsen, 60, Greenlandic politician, Mayor of Nuuk (1993–2007). (Danish)
Roberto Del Giudice, 67, Italian voice actor.
Arthur Dimmock, 89, British campaigner for the deaf.
John Drury, 80, American television journalist, amyotrophic lateral sclerosis.
Norm Hacking, 57, Canadian musician and author, suspected heart attack.
Neil Hope, 35, Canadian actor (Degrassi Junior High, Degrassi High), natural causes.
Peter Houghton, 68, British recipient of the first artificial heart transplant, multiple organ failure.
Peter Lipton, 53, American philosopher, heart attack.
Karl Ohs, 61, American politician, Lieutenant Governor of Montana (2001–2005), brain cancer.
David Francis Pocock, 79, British anthropologist.
Matt Price, 46, Australian journalist (Nine Network, The Australian), brain tumour.

26
Marit Allen, 66, British film costume designer (Mrs. Doubtfire, Eyes Wide Shut, Dirty Rotten Scoundrels), brain aneurysm.
Buddy Burris, 84, American footballer.
George Harris, 84, Australian football administrator, former Carlton president.
Bill Hartack, 74, American Hall of Fame jockey, five-time winner of the Kentucky Derby, heart attack.
Silvestre S. Herrera, 90, Mexican-born American soldier, Medal of Honor recipient.
Takafumi Isomura, 76, Japanese politician, mayor of Osaka (1995–2003), hepatocellular carcinoma.
Elaine Lorillard, 93, American socialite, helped start Newport Jazz Festival, infection.
Herb McKenley, 85, Jamaican 400 m relay gold medalist at 1952 Summer Olympics.
Noel Miller, 94, Australian cricketer.
Raleigh Rhodes, 89, American World War II pilot, early leader of the Blue Angels, lung cancer.
Jaroslav Skála, 91, Czech psychiatrist, campaigner against alcoholism.
Stanley Thorne, 89, British politician, Labour MP for Preston South and Preston (1974–1987).
Susan Williams-Ellis, 89, British founder of Portmeirion Pottery, bronchial pneumonia.
Mel Tolkin, 94, American head writer for Your Show of Shows.

27
Philip Allen, Baron Allen of Abbeydale, 95, British civil servant.
Bernie Banton, 61, Australian asbestosis compensation campaigner, mesothelioma.
Robert Cade, 80, American doctor, inventor of Gatorade, kidney failure.
Jack Eliis, 95, British rugby union player.
Nicodemus Kirima, 71, Kenyan Roman Catholic Archbishop of Nyeri, kidney failure.
Kavungal Chathunni Panicker, 86, Indian classical dancer.
Cecil Payne, 84, American saxophonist, prostate cancer.
Jane Rule, 76, Canadian author of lesbian-themed works, liver cancer.
Sean Taylor, 24, American football player (Washington Redskins), homicide by gunshot.
Bill Willis, 86, American football player (Ohio State, Cleveland Browns) and member of the Pro Football Hall of Fame.

28
Albert Asriyan, 56, Azerbaijani-born American violinist, composer, arranger and band leader, leukemia.
Jeanne Bates, 89, American film actress (Eraserhead, Die Hard 2), breast cancer.
Elly Beinhorn, 100, German pilot and author.
Fred Chichin, 53, French musician, songwriter and leader of Les Rita Mitsouko, cancer.
Donyo Donev, 81, Bulgarian cartoonist and animator (The Three Fools).
Mali Finn, 69, American casting agent, (Titanic, L.A. Confidential, The Matrix), cancer.
Tony Holland, 67, British co-creator of EastEnders.
Bob Simpson, 77, Canadian football player, prostate cancer.
Petter C.G. Sundt, 62, Norwegian shipping magnate, cancer. 
Ashley Titus, 36, South African rapper and TV presenter ("Mr. Fat"), heart problems.
James Miles Venne, 89, Canadian northern Saskatchewan First Nations leader.
Gudrun Wagner, 63, German co-organizer of the Bayreuth Festival, wife of Wolfgang Wagner.

29
James Barber, 84, British-born Canadian cooking show host (The Urban Peasant).
Ralph Beard, 79, American college basketball player for the University of Kentucky involved in point-shaving scandal, heart failure.
Henry Hyde, 83, American member of the US House of Representatives from Illinois (1975–2007).
Jane Lawton, 63, American Democratic Maryland politician, heart attack.
Jim Nesbitt, 75, American country music singer.
Roger Bonham Smith, 82, American chairman and CEO of General Motors (1981–1990).

30
 J. L. Ackrill, 86, British philosopher.
 Engin Arık, 59, Turkish physicist, plane crash.
 Seymour Benzer, 86, American genetic biologist, stroke.
 Ian Crawford, 73, Scottish footballer (Hearts).
 Evel Knievel, 69, American stunt performer.
 Ian MacArthur, 82, British politician, MP for Perth and East Perthshire (1959–1974).
 François-Xavier Ortoli, 82, French President of the European Commission (1973–1977).
 John Strugnell, 77, American biblical scholar, complications from an infection.
 Sam Vasquez, 35, American mixed martial arts competitor, brain injury sustained during fight.

References

2007-11
 11